Central is an abandoned rapid transit station in the Austin neighborhood of Chicago, Illinois. The station served the Chicago Transit Authority's Congress Line, which is now part of the Blue Line. Central opened on October 10, 1960, and closed on September 2, 1973, as part of a group of budget-related CTA station closings.

References

External links

Boarded Up Entrance to former Central CTA Congress Line Station from Google Street Maps

Defunct Chicago "L" stations
Railway stations in the United States opened in 1960
Railway stations closed in 1973
1960 establishments in Illinois
1973 disestablishments in Illinois